Tyler Feeley (born January 10, 1997) is a Serbian-American soccer player who plays for FC Arizona in the National Premier Soccer League.

External links
 USL Pro profile

1997 births
Living people
American soccer players
Orange County SC players
Saint Louis FC players
Soccer players from Arizona
USL Championship players
Association football forwards